Margaret Agnes Todd (née Sutcliffe; May 31, 1918 – July 15, 2019) was a Canadian golfer and an inductee in the Canadian Golf Hall of Fame. 

Born in Montreal, Quebec, Margaret Todd (née Sutcliffe) joined the Uplands Golf Club, as a junior in 1936 and a year later, now Mrs. Jack Todd, became a member of the Victoria Golf Club. In 1939, she won the club championship for the first of 14 times. In 1940, she added her initial Victoria & District title, which she went on to claim 10 times.

After the war and a hiatus to raise her family, Todd was back playing near "scratch" and won three consecutive B.C. Amateur Ladies titles, seven Jasper Totem and three Empress competitions. In the 1950s, she qualified for both the Canadian and U.S. championships and gained the first of five selections to Canada's International Golf team playing in Britain, Australia and Argentina.

In the 1970s, Todd, competing in the senior ladies, twice won titles in the City, Provincial and Canadian championships. Throughout her career she captained the B.C. Ladies and B.C. Senior Woman's team on 16 occasions. Her administrative accomplishments, since the 1960s, include Victoria and B.C. appointments to the national and international level.

Todd has been honoured as a Life Member of the Victoria Golf Club, inducted into the BC Sports Hall of Fame and inducted into the Canadian Golf Hall of Fame. She turned 100 in May 2018 and died in July 2019 at the age of 101 in Victoria, British Columbia.

Wins
British Columbia Amateur (1947, 1948, 1949)
British Columbia Senior Ladies (1975, 1976)
Canadian Ladies' Senior (1976, 1977)

References

Canadian female golfers
Amateur golfers
Golfing people from Quebec
Golfing people from British Columbia
Canadian centenarians
Women centenarians
Sportspeople from Montreal
1918 births
2019 deaths